The Black Seeds, a New Zealand eight-piece reggae band, has released seven studio albums as well as two remix albums, and a live album. The band formed in 1997 in Wellington, New Zealand but did not release their first studio album, Keep On Pushing L.P, until 2001. Even though this album was on a small budget, it still reached platinum status in New Zealand, as well as having success in Australia. A remix album was also released in 2002 called Pushed, which included songs from the first album remixed by local DJs.

Their second studio album, On the Sun, was released three years later in 2004 and debuted at number 3 in the New Zealand music charts. It later went on to double-platinum status, as well as spawning three popular singles; "So True", "Turn It Around", and "Fire". So True reached number 32 on the New Zealand singles chart, as well as number 29 on the France Groove Chart, and number 100 on the French singles chart.

Into the Dojo was the third studio album released by The Black Seeds, and was released in 2006. It spent five consecutive weeks at number 1 on the New Zealand albums chart and, like their previous album, also achieved double-platinum status. It stayed in the charts for 52 weeks. This album was the start of the band's popularity spreading around the world, with the German-based label Sonar Kollektiv signing them and releasing Into the Dojo into Europe in 2007, as well as two 12" vinyl EPs. Four singles were released from this album, including "Cool Me Down", which reached number 26 on the New Zealand single chart.

Solid Ground is the fourth and most recent studio album, released in 2008. It reached platinum status in New Zealand as well as reaching #2 on the music charts. It was also released in Australia and Europe. In July 2009, The Black Seeds signed with American label Easy Star Records, then toured around America supporting John Brown's Body, before John Brown's Body came to New Zealand to tour with The Black Seeds in their home country. During this tour, Solid Ground was released in America and reached number 15 on the US Billboard Reggae chart. During the New Zealand leg of this tour, Live Vol. 1, their first live album was released. It was only made available at their live shows, with tickets brought for these shows, or as a digital download.

Albums

Studio albums

Live albums

Remix albums

Extended plays

Singles

References

External links
Official Website

Discographies of New Zealand artists